Smicronychini is a tribe of true weevils in the family of beetles known as Curculionidae. There are at least 7 genera in Smicronychini.

Genera
These seven genera belong to the tribe Smicronychini:
 Afrosmicronyx Hustache, 1935 g
 Hedychrous Marshall, 1923 c g
 Promecotarsus Casey, 1892 i c g b
 Sharpia Tournier, 1873 c g
 Smicronyx Schönherr, 1843 i c g b
 Smicrorhynchus Scudder, 1893 c g
 Topelatus Hustache, 1920 c g
Data sources: i = ITIS, c = Catalogue of Life, g = GBIF, b = Bugguide.net

References

Further reading

External links

 

Curculioninae